This is a list of bridges in Kazakhstan

Major road and railway bridges 
This table presents the structures with spans greater than 100 meters (non-exhaustive list).

Notes and References 
 Notes

 

 Others references

See also 

 Transport in Kazakhstan
 Rail transport in Kazakhstan
 Roads in Kazakhstan
 Geography of Kazakhstan

External links 

 

Kazakhstan
 
Bridges
Bridges